Parornix trepidella is a moth of the family Gracillariidae. It is known from the United States (including Pennsylvania).

References

Parornix
Moths of North America
Moths described in 1860